Carlos Morales, (born September 11, United States) is an American-born Puerto Rican soccer player who plays as a midfielder for Gigantes de Carolina FC of the Puerto Rico Soccer League and the Puerto Rico national football team.

Career statistics
(correct as of 27 September 2008)

References

1982 births
Living people
American soccer players
American people of Puerto Rican descent
Puerto Rico Islanders players
Penn FC players
USL Second Division players
Crystal Palace Baltimore players
Puerto Rican footballers
People from Freehold Borough, New Jersey
Association football midfielders
Puerto Rico international footballers